"You Can Make Me Dance, Sing or Anything (Even Take the Dog for a Walk, Mend a Fuse, Fold Away the Ironing Board, or Any Other Domestic Shortcomings)" was the last official single by British rock group Faces, released in November 1974. It later appeared on their 1976 greatest hits album Snakes and Ladders / The Best of Faces.

Released under the group title, Rod Stewart and the Faces, the single reached number 12 over Christmas 1974 in the UK Singles Chart. The song still holds the record for the longest song-title ever to hit the UK chart.

As hinted by the title, the song follows a man happy to be with his honey:  "And I end up crying, but listen/ I can be a millionaire/ Honey when you're standing there/ You're so exciting/ You can make me dance."

Personnel
Kenney Jones - drums
Ian McLagan - piano, organ
Rod Stewart - vocals
Ronnie Wood - guitar, backing vocals
Tetsu Yamauchi - bass

Charts

References 

1974 singles
Faces (band) songs
Songs written by Rod Stewart
1974 songs
Warner Records singles
Songs written by Ronnie Wood
Songs written by Ian McLagan